{{DISPLAYTITLE:Delta2 Canis Minoris}}

Astronomic findings
The star figures from our part of the galaxy as the more central of three that share the Delta designation (the greek-lettered catalog is that of Johann Bayer's 1603 Uranometria atlas of bright stars) in star atlases very close, southwest of Delta3 Canis Minoris which is physically unrelated. The Flamsteed designation for this star is 8 Canis Minoris in John Flamsteed's 1712 star catalog.

As of 2008, no companion has been suspected or found orbiting δ2 Canis Minoris. The apparent magnitude of 5.589 means it is deemed visible to the naked eye but faint and requires a dark sky to view. Based on parallax measurements it is calculated to be  distant from the Earth.

This star is rotating rapidly; the projected rotational velocity is 117.6 km/s, which means that the equator of this star is rotating at this velocity or greater. By comparison, the Sun is a slow rotator with an equatorial azimuthal velocity of 2 km/s. δ2 Canis Minoris has a stellar classification of F2 V, indicating that this is an F-type main-sequence star that is generating energy at its core through thermonuclear fusion of hydrogen. The effective temperature of the photosphere is about 7053 K, giving it the yellow-white hue that is characteristic of F-type stars. The radius of this star can be estimated indirectly based upon the measured brightness and color information, which suggests the star is about 86% larger than the Sun.

References

Canis Minoris, Delta2
Canis Minor
F-type main-sequence stars
Canis Minoris, 08
036723
2887
060111
Durchmusterung objects